This is a list of full generals in the Royal Danish Army and Air Force. The rank of general (or full general to distinguish it from the lower general officer ranks) is the highest rank currently achievable by serving officers. It ranks above lieutenant general and was prior to 1842 below general field marshal.

List of generals

See also
General (Denmark)

Notes

References
Citations

Bibliography
 
 
 
 
 
 
 
 
 
 
 
 
 
 
 
 
 
 
 
 

Danish generals